Figino Serenza is a comune (municipality) in the Province of Como in the Italian region Lombardy, located about  north of Milan and about  southeast of Como. As of 31 December 2004, it had a population of 4,842 and an area of 4.9 km².

Figino Serenza borders the following municipalities: Cantù, Carimate, Mariano Comense, Novedrate.

Demographic evolution

References

External links
 Official website

Cities and towns in Lombardy